East Bolaang Mongondow Regency is a regency of North Sulawesi Province of Indonesia. It covers an area of 910.18 sq km and had a population of 63,654 at the 2010 Census, rising to 87,241 at the 2020 Census. The principal town lies at Tutuyan.

Administration 
At the time of the 2010 Census, the Regency was divided into five districts (kecamatan). However in 2016 two additional districts were created - Mooat District and Motongkad District. The districts are tabulated below with their areas and their populations at the 2010 Census and the 2020 Census. The table also includes the numbers of administrative villages (desa) in each district and its postal code.

Notes: (a) including three offshore islands. (b) the 2010 population of Motongkad District is included in the figure for Nuangan District, from which it was cut out in 2016. (c) the most northerly district within the regency, including four offshore islands. (d) a Christian majority district. (e) the 2010 population of Mooat District is included in the figure for Modayag District, from which it was cut out in 2016.

Climate
Tutuyan, the seat of the regency has a tropical rainforest climate (Af) with moderate rainfall in August and September and heavy rainfall in the remaining months.

References

Regencies of North Sulawesi